Olivier-Maurice Augé (July 20, 1840 – June 22, 1897) was a Canadian politician.

Born in Saint-Ambroise-de-Kildare, near Joliette, Quebec, Augé was a lawyer before running unsuccessfully as the Conservative candidate in the 1890 Quebec election for the riding of Montréal no. 2. He was elected to the Legislative Assembly of Quebec in 1892 and was defeated in 1897.

References
 

1840 births
1897 deaths
Conservative Party of Quebec MNAs